Tiazesim, or thiazesim, previously sold under the brand name Altinil, is a heterocyclic antidepressant related to the tricyclic antidepressants (TCAs) which, first introduced in 1966 by Squibb Corporation (now Bristol-Myers Squibb), has since been discontinued and is no longer marketed.

See also
 Diltiazem
 Tofenacin

References

Dimethylamino compounds
Benzothiazepines
Antidepressants
Lactams